Licarbazepine is a voltage-gated sodium channel blocker with anticonvulsant and mood-stabilizing effects that is related to oxcarbazepine. It is an active metabolite of oxcarbazepine. In addition, an enantiomer of licarbazepine, eslicarbazepine ((S)-(+)-licarbazepine), is an active metabolite of eslicarbazepine acetate. Oxcarbazepine and eslicarbazepine acetate are inactive on their own, and behave instead as prodrugs to licarbazepine and eslicarbazepine, respectively, to produce their therapeutic effects.

References 

Secondary alcohols
Anticonvulsants
Dibenzazepines
Human drug metabolites
Mood stabilizers
Ureas